Hayat Sana Güzel (English: Life is Beautiful to You) is a song by Turkish artist Murat Boz, taken from his forthcoming third studio album. 
The song is the third official single to be physically released, fourth overall to receive a digital release and eleventh to have a music video.
The song is also theme from the Soda-pop advert "Yedigün". The song was released on 17 March 2010.
However, the song was not included on the final track list of his third studio album Aşklarım Büyük Benden for unknown reasons.

Track list

References 

2010 singles
Murat Boz songs
2010 songs